Klagenfurt Airport ( and occasionally Kärnten Airport) is a primary international airport near Klagenfurt, the sixth-largest city in Austria.

History

Early years
In 1905, Georg Count of Khevenhüller from Hochosterwitz Castle and in 1907 Dipl.-Ing. Joseph Sablatnig (Joseph Sablatnig was owner of the Fokker-Sablatnig, Deutsche Flugzeuge, Deutsche Motoren, Flugzeug Gesellschaft mbH, Berlin) were the first men in the sky over Carinthia and Klagenfurt.

In World War I and II, the airport of Klagenfurt was operated as a military airfield, and indeed Klagenfurt Airport was founded in 1914 as a military airport. The civil opening of Klagenfurt Airport on 17 May 1925, was an event for the City of Klagenfurt as well as for Carinthia. In June 1929, the pilot hero of World War I, Julius Fedrigoni Edler von Etschthal, has the function of flight director of the airport until 1939. After the end of World War II, Julius Fedrigoni was returned to Annabichl, he worked with low-budget flight operations. On 1 January 1952, Korv. Kpt. Julius Fedrigoni founded the Committee city of Klagenfurt and he was flight director until 1956.

Already in the years 1926 to 1938, seven airlines operated from Klagenfurt Airport. Countries like Germany, Italy, Yugoslavia and of course domestic flights to all major cities in Austria were connected with Klagenfurt.

Recent developments
In spring 2014 the airport's home carrier Austrian Airlines announced the closure of their ticketing and service counters at Klagenfurt Airport due to decreasing demand, additional services will be instead provided directly at the check-in counters. In April 2015, Austrian Airlines also announced that a closure of their domestic route to Vienna is under consideration within the next few years based on economic reasons. In the same year, the state government announced plans to partly sell its stakes in the airport to private investors.

As the airport suffered from a major decrease of passenger numbers in recent years it has been suggested by the management to establish major logistics and cargo operators here, which might be supported by the freight shipment operations handled at the relatively closely located harbours of the Adriatic Sea. The airport already features road and rail connections. However, Austrian Airlines stated later that the airport is not sufficient for cargo operations due to noise complaints and the night curfew.

In October 2015, the Austrian military announced it would end all operations and close its helicopter base at Klagenfurt Airport by the end of 2015.

In August 2020, Ryanair announced plans to leave the airport and terminate their route to Palma de Mallorca Airport, which had been operated as a wetlease by Lauda. However, Ryanair returned with four destinations in 2023.

Facilities
Klagenfurt Airport consists of one small passenger terminal building which features some shops and restaurants as well as a visitors terrace. The apron provides several stands for mid-sized planes such as the Airbus A320 as well as smaller general aviation aircraft. As there are no jet bridges, buses are used for boarding.

Airlines and destinations
The following airlines offer year-round and seasonal scheduled and charter flights at Klagenfurt Airport:

Statistics

Ground transportation

Train
The train station "Klagenfurt-Annabichl" is at a 5–10 minutes (750 meters) walking distance from the terminal and offers suburban rail services every half-hour to St.Veit (and beyond), to Klagenfurt central station, to the villages along Lake Wörthersee, and to Villach (and beyond).

Road
The airport has its own exit named Klagenfurt Flughafen on the nearby motorway A2, which leads to Vienna and Italy. A regular suburban bus service connects the airport with the city centre including the Klagenfurt central station. There is also a coach connection between Klagenfurt Airport and Ljubljana Jože Pučnik Airport, which is served several times a day.

See also
 Transport in Austria
 List of airports in Austria

References

Citations

Bibliography
 Flughafen Klagenfurt, Paul Posch, P. 1995 Magistrat der Landeshauptstadt, Klagenfurt, Abt. Kultur, 182 p.

External links

 Official website
 
 

Airports in Austria
Klagenfurt
Airports established in 1914
Buildings and structures in Carinthia (state)
International airports in Austria